Virgin Island is a 1958 British drama film directed by Pat Jackson and starring John Cassavetes, Virginia Maskell and Sidney Poitier. It is an adaptation of the memoir Our Virgin Island by Robb White and was filmed on the British Virgin Islands. The American release in 1960 followed the title of the novel.

Premise
A British woman (Virginia Maskell) marries an American writer (John Cassavetes) in spite of her family's disapproval and goes to live with him on a tropical island.

Cast

References

External links

1958 films
1958 drama films
Films set in the Virgin Islands
British drama films
British Lion Films films
Films with screenplays by Ring Lardner Jr.
Films directed by Pat Jackson
Films scored by Clifton Parker
Films based on works by Robb White
Films based on non-fiction books
Films set on islands
1950s English-language films
1950s British films